Palmerston was an electoral division of the Legislative Assembly in Australia's Northern Territory. It existed from 1987 to 1997. It was named after the town of Palmerston.

Members for Palmerston

Election results

Elections in the 1980s

Elections in the 1990s

References

Former electoral divisions of the Northern Territory